Anneliese Gerhards (born 4 July 1935) is a German athlete. She competed in the women's javelin throw at the 1960, 1964 and the 1972 Summer Olympics.

References

External links
 

1935 births
Living people
People from Viersen (district)
Sportspeople from Düsseldorf (region)
German female javelin throwers
West German female javelin throwers
Olympic female javelin throwers
Olympic athletes of the United Team of Germany
Olympic athletes of West Germany
Athletes (track and field) at the 1960 Summer Olympics
Athletes (track and field) at the 1964 Summer Olympics
Athletes (track and field) at the 1972 Summer Olympics
Japan Championships in Athletics winners